Fireball may refer to:

Science
 Fireball (meteor), a brighter-than-usual meteor
 Ball lightning, an atmospheric electrical phenomenon
 Bassia scoparia, a plant species

Arts and entertainment

Films
 The Fireball, a 1950 film starring Mickey Rooney and Pat O'Brien
 Fireball (film), a 2009 Thai martial arts action film directed by Thanakorn Pongsuwan
 Fireball (anime), a series of CGI anime shorts
 Fireball: Visitors from Darker Worlds, a 2020 documentary film directed by Werner Herzog and Clive Oppenheimer

Fictional characters
 Fireball Hikari, a protagonist of Saber Rider and the Star Sheriffs American animated TV series (1987–1988)
 the main character from the 70s comic book Bullet (DC Thomson)
 a member of the Crusaders (DC Comics) team of superheroes
 a member of the All-Star Squadron
 a member of the New Crusaders (Archie Comics) superhero team
 one of the "stalkers" from the film The Running Man
 Rudolph's friend who is a reindeer in Rudolph the Red-Nosed Reindeer

Music
 Fireballs (band), an Australian Punkabilly band
 The Fireballs, an American rock and roll band
 Fireball (album), a 1971 hard rock album by British band Deep Purple
 "Fireball" (Deep Purple song), a 1971 Deep Purple song from the album of the same name
 "Fireball" (Dev song), the debut single by American singer Dev
 "Fireball" (B'z song), a 1997 single by Japanese band B'z
 "Fireball" (Pitbull song), a 2014 song by Pitbull featuring John Ryan
 "Fireball" (Willow Smith song), 1 2011 song by Willow Smith

Other arts and entertainment
 Fireball (manga), a 1979 unfinished manga
 Fireball (novel), a science fiction novel and the first in the Fireball trilogy by John Christopher
 Fireball (pinball), a pinball machine
 Hadouken (Street Fighter), also referred to as fireball, a ki-energy attack in the game Street Fighter
 Fireball (Dungeons & Dragons), a fictional magic spell in Dungeons & Dragons
 Fire Ball, an amusement ride

Ammunition
 .221 Remington Fireball, a centerfire cartridge
 .17 Remington Fireball, based on the .221 Fireball
 .300 Whisper, sometimes known as the .300 Fireball

Sports
 Fireball (nickname), various sportspeople
 Fireball (wrestling move), an illegal professional wrestling move
 Augusta FireBall, an American soccer team in 2005 and 2006
 Tucson Fireballs, an American United Soccer Leagues team from 1997 to 2001, originally the Los Angeles Fireballs
 Fireball (wrestler), a Mexican professional wrestler
 Fireball (dinghy), a type of small sailing boat

Transportation
 Ryan FR Fireball, an American aircraft
 Fireball (dinghy), a sailing boat
 Buick V6 engine, originally marketed as Fireball

Other uses
 Fireball (search engine), a web search engine
 Fireball (software), a browser-hijacking malware
 Fireball Cinnamon Whisky, a cinnamon flavoured Canadian whisky liqueur
 522d Special Operations Squadron, a US Air Force squadron nicknamed the Fireballs
 McMaster Engineering Fireball, official symbol of the Faculty of Engineering McMaster University
 Atomic Fireball, a round, cinnamon-flavored hard candy invented by Nello Ferrara
 The Fireballs annual ceremony in Stonehaven

See also
 Fireball XL5, a British TV series
 Fireball 500, a 1966 stock car racing film
 Ball of Fire (disambiguation)
 Great Balls of Fire (disambiguation)